Hito Çako (2 March 19235 November 1975) was an Albanian politician and lieutenant general of the Albanian People's Army. He also was among the 154 persons to whom the title "Hero of the People" ( Hero i Popullit ) was awarded.

Life 
Born in Progonat on 2 March 1923, he joined LANÇ and the Albanian Communist Party in 1942. He was interned in Italy in 1942–3 until the country's capitulation to the allied forces. Upon returning to Albania, he joined the 5th Attacking Brigade and was promoted to the rank of political commissar. In 1944 he was promoted to the rank of vice-commander of the 2nd Attacking Corps. Of his relatives Rakip (1923–1943) died in Shëntriadhë fighting the Italian army, while Remzi and Shefqet (1924–1944) died fighting the German army in Cepo and Qesarat respectively.

After Teme Sejko's purge he acted as political vice-admiral of the fleet until Sejko's replacement by Abdi Mati. Çako was a long-standing member of the party's Central Committee and a deputy of Vlorë County in the Albanian parliament until 1974, when in the first phases of the Sino-Albanian split he was accused of being a member of a pro-PRC coup d'état headed by party leader Beqir Balluku. He was executed by firing squad in 1975.

On 18 July 2000, his body was exhumed at the request of his family and interred together with Balluku's body in a secret grave in Hore-Vranisht in Vlorë District.

Sources 

1923 births
1975 deaths
20th-century Albanian politicians
Labour Party of Albania politicians
People from Tepelenë
Albanian communists
Communism in Albania
Albanian resistance members
Albanian anti-fascists
Executed politicians
Albanian people executed by the communist regime
People executed by Albania by firing squad
Frunze Military Academy alumni
N. G. Kuznetsov Naval Academy alumni
Members of the Parliament of Albania
Military Academy of the General Staff of the Armed Forces of the Soviet Union alumni